2019 in Glory was the eighth year in the history of the international kickboxing promotion. The first event of the year, Glory 63: Houston, would also be the first to be broadcast on UFC Fight Pass as part of a new agreement with the UFC that saw their Fight Pass streaming service become the exclusive carrier of Glory events in the United States. Glory events are also broadcast through television agreements with Veronica TV, and other regional channels around the world.

Glory 2019 Awards 
The following fighters won the GLORY Kickboxing year-end awards for 2019:
Glory Fighter of the Year 2019: Alex Pereira
Glory Fight of the Year 2019: Antonio Plazibat vs. Tomas Mozny 
Glory Knockout of the Year 2019: Ross Levine against Thomas Diagne 
Glory Newcomer of the Year 2019: Antonio Plazibat
Glory Highlight of the Year 2019: Rico Verhoeven vs. Badr Hari

List of events

Glory 63: Houston

Glory 63: Houston was a kickboxing event held by Glory on February 1, 2019, at the Arena Theater in Houston, USA.

Background
This event featured a rematch between the champion Petchpanomrung Kiatmookao and top contender Serhiy Adamchuk for the Glory Featherweight Championship as the Glory 63: Houston headliner.

Glory heavyweight D’Angelo Marshall was unable to compete due to a visa issue that forced him from the fight card. Demoreo Dennis instead faced newcomer James Chapman.

Results

Glory 64: Strasbourg

Glory 64: Strasbourg was a kickboxing event held by Glory on March 9, 2019, at the Rhénus Sport in Strasbourg, France.

Background
A Glory Welterweight Championship bout between current champion Harut Grigorian and former champion Cedric Doumbe served as the Glory 64: Strasbourg main event. The pairing were supposed to have met previously in October 2018 at Glory 60: Lyon, but Grigorian was unable to compete due to acute gastroenteritis.

In the co-featured slot, a Glory Women's Super Bantamweight Championship bout between current champion Anissa Meksen and former champion Tiffany van Soest took place. The pairing met previously at Glory 48: New York in December 2017 with Meksen capturing the title via unanimous decision.

Mohamed Abdallah was forced to withdraw from his main card bout with Daniel Škvor due to injuries sustained during training. D’Angelo Marshall stepped in on short notice to face Skvor.

Yassine Ahaggan had to withdraw from his match with Matej Penaz due to injuries sustained during training. Donovan Wisse takes his place against Penaz.

Esma Hasshass was scheduled to face Jiwaen Lee, but Hasshass was forced off the card for undisclosed reasons. Sarah Moussaddak served as the replacement.

William Goldie-Galloway was set to fight with Itay Gershon but had to withdraw the day of the fight for medical reasons. As a result, the fight was canceled.

Results

Glory 65: Utrecht

Glory 65: Utrecht was a kickboxing event held by Glory on May 17, 2019, at the Central Studios in Utrecht, Netherlands.

Background

Results

Glory 66: Paris

Glory 66: Paris was a kickboxing event held by Glory on June 22, 2019, at the Zénith Paris in Paris, France.

Background
The bout between Luis Tavares and Stéphane Susperregui was expected for the GLORY 66 main card. On June 12, however, Susperregui pulled out of the bout due to the measles virus. Felipe Micheletti was pulled from a planned Superfight Series bout with Artur Gorlov and faced Tavares in the main card bout. Gorlov instead faced Yegish Yegoian.

Nordine Mahieddine was due to fight Tomas Mozny in the GLORY 66 Superfight Series, but the Slovak fighter withdrew due to an injury. Mahieddine instead faced the former K-1 Heavyweight Champion Antonio Plazibat, who stepped in on short notice for this encounter.

Results

Glory 67: Orlando

Glory 67: Orlando was a kickboxing event held by Glory on July 5, 2019, at the Silver Spurs Arena in Orlando, USA.

Background
Former super bantamweight champion Tiffany van Soest has been forced to withdraw from her scheduled GLORY 67 co-main event bout with Jady Menezes due to laser surgery after a slight detachment of the retina in one of her eyes. The bout will be rescheduled to a future Glory card.

Results

Glory 68: Miami

Glory 68: Miami was a kickboxing event held by Glory on September 28, 2019, at the James L. Knight Center in Miami, USA.

Background
Itay Gershon was scheduled to face Josh Jauncey at Glory 68, but the Israeli fighter suffered a broken rib in training and withdrew from the fight. Stepping in on a 3 weeks notice to replace Gerson was Lorawnt Nelson.

A Super Bantamweight bout between Bekah Irwin and Crystal Lawson was previously scheduled for the Glory 68 preliminary card. However, Irwin pulled out of the fight due injury she sustained in a car accident and the bout was scrapped.

Results

Glory 69: Düsseldorf

Glory 69: Düsseldorf was a kickboxing event held by Glory on October 12, 2019, at the ISS Dome in Düsseldorf, Germany.

Background

Results

Glory 70: Lyon

Glory 70: Lyon was a kickboxing event held by Glory on October 26, 2019, at the Palais des Sports de Gerland in Lyon, France.

Background
Cedric Doumbe was out of his GLORY 70 title defence against Murthel Groenhart due to an elbow injury. Troy Jones stepped in on a week notice to face Groenhart for interim Glory Welterweight Title in the GLORY 70 main event.

Results

Glory 71: Chicago

Glory 71: Chicago was a kickboxing event held by Glory on November 22, 2019, at the Wintrust Arena in Chicago, USA.

Background

Results

Glory 72: Chicago

Glory 72: Chicago was a kickboxing event held by Glory on November 23, 2019, at the Wintrust Arena in Chicago, USA.

Background
The Glory Featherweight Championship bout between Petchpanomrung Kiatmookao and Aleksei Ulianov  was expected for Glory 72: Chicago main event. However, on November 13, Ulianov pulled out of the bout due to visa issues. Kevin VanNostrand was pulled from the co-main event bout with Anvar Boynazarov and faced Kiatmookao in the main event for the Glory Featherweight Championship. His bout with Boynazarov was scrapped, as a result, the Jady Menezes vs. Chommanee Sor Taehiran bout was promoted to the main card.

Results

Glory 73: Shenzhen

Glory 73: Shenzhen was a kickboxing event held by Glory on December 7, 2019, at the Shenzhen Bay Sports Center in Shenzhen, China.

Background

Results

Glory Collision 2

Glory Collision 2 (also known as Glory 74: Arnhem) was a kickboxing event held by Glory on December 21, 2019, at the GelreDome in Arnhem, Netherlands.

Background
It featured the highly anticipated rematch between GLORY Heavyweight champion, Rico Verhoeven, and Badr Hari. The event broke attendance record in the Netherlands.

Results

See also
 2019 in Kunlun Fight
 2019 in ONE Championship
 2019 in Romanian kickboxing

References

External links
Official website

Glory (kickboxing) events
2019 in kickboxing